JSW Youth Cup is an Indian association football tournament for residential academies held  in Bellary and organised by Bengaluru Football Club annually. The tournament was first started in 2022.

Bengaluru FC  Club had announced that the 1st edition of the JSW Youth Cup football tournament was going to be held from third week of March.

Winners

References

Football cup competitions in India
Youth football competitions
Youth football in India
2022 establishments in India
Recurring sporting events established in 2022